A stepchild is the offspring of one's spouse, but not one's own offspring, either biologically or through adoption.

Stepchildren can come into a family in a variety of ways. A stepchild may be the child of one's spouse from a previous relationship, or alternatively, be the result of an adoption, in which case the child would have no biological relationship with either parent. Some also apply the term loosely to non-custodial relationships where “stepparent" can refer to the partner of a parent with whom the child does not live.

Stepchildren play a significant role in the lives of their parents and siblings. In many cases, stepchildren are welcomed into a family and are treated as full members, with the same rights and responsibilities as biological children. However, in some cases, stepchildren may face challenges or difficulties in their relationships with their parents or siblings, and may require additional support and guidance in order to feel fully integrated into the family.

See also
 Stepfamily

References

Stepfamily